Inge Borgström is a retired female badminton player of Denmark.

Career
She won the bronze medal at the 1977 IBF World Championships in women's doubles with Pia Nielsen. They also won a bronze at European Championship in 1978 after being beaten by Nora Perry and Anne Statt of England in semifinals with 14–17, 11–15.

References

Danish female badminton players
Living people
Year of birth missing (living people)
20th-century Danish women